Kenneth Dale Cassens (April 8, 1935 – December 17, 1987) was an American politician and school Board Member in the state of Florida.

Cassens was born in Fort Pierce, Florida in 1935. A citrus farmer and businessman, he is an alumnus of the University of Florida, where he earned a Bachelor of Science degree in 1957. He served in the Florida House of Representatives from 1977 to 1978, as a Democrat, representing the 88th district.

The Dale Cassens Exceptional Students Education Center in Fort Pierce, Florida was named in his honor. DCEC is a unique school that is designed to meet the individual needs of each student. Students volunteer to attend DCEC to achieve their educational goals, to earn credits toward graduation, to learn how to manage behavior as society expects, and to pursue their life-long goals.

Dale and his brother Rudolph worked together to build a family cabin in the North Georgia mountains. Rudolph was quoted as saying that it was one of his greatest joys.
Dale Cassens died of a heart attack in 1987. He was 52 years old.

References

1987 deaths
1935 births
Democratic Party members of the Florida House of Representatives
20th-century American politicians